Silver Marlin is an Israeli unmanned surface vehicle (USV) designed for maritime patrol missions. It is equipped with a 7.62mm remote-controlled stabilized weapon station as well as observation and satellite communication systems. It has an endurance of 24–36 hours, with a primary mission of reconnaissance, surveillance, force protection/anti-terror, anti-surface and anti-mine warfare, search and rescue, port and waterway patrol, battle damage assessment, pollution detection and treatment as well as electronic warfare.

References

External links
 New Tools for New Rules PDF
 Elbit Systems Silver Marlin promo video

Unmanned surface vehicles of Israel